The United States Supreme Court typically keeps all deliberations and draft opinions private while a case is pending. At the start of the publication process, the court releases a single slip opinion for the case. However, some instances of news leaks of private deliberations or draft opinions have occurred.

19th century
In 1852, ten days before the justices announced their ruling, the New-York Tribune published the decision in Pennsylvania v. Wheeling and Belmont Bridge Company. When the case returned to the Court two years later, the Tribune published the ruling ahead of time again.

In February 1857, Associate Justice John Catron informed President-elect James Buchanan that the Supreme Court would write in Dred Scott v. Sanford that Congress had no power to regulate slavery in federal territories. Catron wanted Justice Robert Cooper Grier, a Pennsylvanian, to join the majority in Dred Scott so there would be at least one Northerner, who would be in favor of the majority's decision. Buchanan wrote to Grier asking him to join the Court's majority, which Grier did. At his inauguration, Buchanan referred to the Dred Scott decision and said the issue of slavery would soon be "speedily and finally" settled by the Supreme Court. The Tribune also published a running account of deliberations in the case, with Justice John McLean suspected of being the leaker.

20th century
The Department of Justice indicted Ashton Embry, a former clerk of Justice Joseph McKenna, in 1919 for leaking pending decisions to Wall Street traders, including a railroad patent case. Embry had resigned a few months earlier to become a baker. No insider trading laws existed then, so Embry was charged with depriving "the United States of its lawful right and duty of promulgating information in the way and at the time required by law and at departmental regulation." The case never went to trial after the government's chief witness was "accused of conspiring with the Germans during World War I." Ninth Circuit Judge John B. Owens told Politico in 2022 that Embry is the only known case where "someone financially benefitted from disclosing inside information at the Supreme Court".

In 1977, NPR's Nina Totenberg reported that by a 5–3 vote, the Court declined to review cases of three defendants in Watergate cases.

Two years later, Warren Burger reassigned a member of the Court's print staff after determining they leaked the results of multiple cases to Tim O’Brien, an ABC News correspondent. In 1986, O'Brien correctly reported the 7-2 vote in Bowsher v. Synar, but got the specific day the Court was expected to announce its ruling wrong, as Burger delayed the announcement, likely because of the leak.

In 1981, United Press International received a draft of an opinion for County of Washington v. Gunther, but withheld publication because it was "unable to establish the authenticity."

Roe v. Wade
While Roe v. Wade was being deliberated, The Washington Post published an article on July 4, 1972, covering infighting by the justices, including an internal memo written by Justice William O. Douglas.

Once a decision was finalized, Larry Hammond, a clerk for Justice Lewis Powell, leaked it to Time, on the condition it would not be published until the ruling was public. The announcement was delayed, but Time was already scheduled to publish and hit newsstands anyways. Chief Justice Warren E. Burger was "livid", and asked the other justices to identify the leaker so they could be punished. Hammond confessed to Powell, offering to resign, but Powell rejected that offer, telling Burger that Hammond was double-crossed. Burger met with Hammond and forgave him, and would also meet with editors from Time.

The reporter who broke the story, David C. Beckwith, said in 2022 that he spoke with about 15 people for the story, including Hammond.

21st century
Multiple former law clerks leaked details about the 2000 Bush v. Gore decision to Vanity Fair in 2004.

In 2012, days after the ruling in National Federation of Independent Business v. Sebelius was announced, CBS News's Jan Crawford reported that Chief Justice John Roberts had switched his vote, from initially wanting to strike down the law in question, to eventually voting to uphold it.

In 2019, CNN reported on Roberts switching his vote in another high profile case, Department of Commerce v. New York, which considered whether a question about citizenship status could be added to the 2020 United States census.

In 2022, during oral arguments in Arizona v. City and County of San Francisco, California, Justice Stephen Breyer commented that a claim was "pretty similar to what we just allowed in that case of the attorney general", inadvertently revealing the Court's decision in Cameron v. EMW Women's Surgical Center, P.S.C., eight days before it would be published.

In November 2022, The New York Times reported that Rev. Rob Schenck, a former anti-abortion leader, had written a letter to Chief Justice Roberts in July about how he had been told in advance that Burwell v. Hobby Lobby Stores, Inc. would be decided in favor of Hobby Lobby, and that the opinion would be authored by Justice Samuel Alito. Schenck reportedly obtained this information from a donor, Gayle Wright, who, with her husband, had dinner with Alito and his wife. Alito called the leak allegation "completely false," and that his relationship with the Wrights was "casual and purely social."

Dobbs v. Jackson Women's Health Organization draft opinion

On May 2, 2022, Politico released a leaked 98-page draft opinion authored by Associate Justice Samuel Alito in a highly watched abortion case, Dobbs v. Jackson Women's Health Organization, which had five votes to overturn Roe v. Wade. The draft was from February, but Politico—and later, The Washington Post—reported that the five-vote majority was still intact. The authenticity of the draft was confirmed by Chief Justice John Roberts, who also directed the Marshal of the Court, Gail Curley, to conduct an investigation into the source of the leak. It is unlikely that the leak violated any federal criminal laws, unless the draft was obtained by hacking, theft, or other unlawful means.

The final majority opinion released on June 24, 2022 was largely the same as the leaked draft, the main additions responding to the concurrence and dissent.

See also
 Branzburg v. Hayes
 Brett Kavanaugh email leak

References

Leaks
Information sensitivity
News leaks